Arrowhead is a former steamboat port and town at the head of Upper Arrow Lake in British Columbia, Canada. Apart from the cemetery, the initial site has been submerged beneath the waters of the lake, which is now part of the reservoir formed by Hugh Keenleyside Dam at Castlegar. However, the name still identifies the locality, and sometimes the local region.

Name origin
Although the likely name origin is Arrowhead being at the head of the Arrow Lakes, another version indicates the finding of arrowheads in the ground during the construction of town buildings, evidencing an ancient battle between First Nations tribes. A further version identifies the arrowhead-shaped appearance of the lake from higher ground. The name of the Arrow Lakes is credited to "Arrow Rock", a large cliffside pictograph shot through with clusters of arrows, again relating to an ancient battle (in this case known to be between the Sinixt and the Ktunaxa), which stood above "the Narrows", a stretch of fast-flowing channel connecting Upper Arrow to Lower Arrow Lake.

See also
List of ghost towns in British Columbia
Steamboats of the Arrow Lakes
Comaplix, British Columbia
Beaton, British Columbia

References

Arrow Lakes
Ghost towns in British Columbia
British Columbia populated places on the Columbia River